Aurelio Desdentado Bonete (29 March 1944 – 19 March 2021) was a Spanish judge, member of the Supreme Court between 1986 and 2014.

Biography
Desdentado was born in Elche, province of Alicante on 29 March 1944 and began his career as a labor lawyer and in the Social Security administration, being also an arbitrator in labor disputes. On 6 March 1986 the General Council of the Judiciary named him judge of the Social Chamber of the Supreme Court,  office he held until 2014, when he retired and was succeeded by Sempere Navarro. He was also professor of Labor Law at the Autonomous University of Madrid and the Charles III University of Madrid. In 2013 he received the Order of Saint Raymond of Peñafort.  

He had a recognized reputation in the field of labor law, establishing doctrine with his rulings, especially during the last years of the Spanish transition to democracy and in matters such as the creation of non-regular permanent personnel of the Public Administration, the labor contracting of contractors and subcontractors, the right to strike, among others.

He died in Madrid on 19 March 2021 from COVID-19 during the COVID-19 pandemic in Spain at the age of 76.

References

1944 births
2021 deaths
People from Elche
20th-century Spanish judges
21st-century Spanish judges
Deaths from the COVID-19 pandemic in Spain
Academic staff of the Autonomous University of Madrid
Academic staff of the Charles III University of Madrid